The 2006–2007 Israeli Basketball Super League season was the 53rd season of top division basketball in Israel.

Regular season

Standings 

Source: Official Ligat HaAl website
Pts=Points, P=Matches played, W=Matches won, L=Matches lost, F=Points for, A=Points against, D=Points difference.

Final four

Awards

Regular season MVP 

  Lee Nailon (Bnei Hasharon)

First team 

  Nikola Vujčić (Maccabi Tel Aviv)
  Mario Austin (Hapoel Jerusalem)
  Lee Nailon (Bnei Hasharon)
  Chester Simmons (Hapoel Galil Elyon)
  Raviv Limonad (Ironi Nahariya)

Coach of the season 

  Oded Kattash (Hapoel Galil Elyon)

Best Defender 

  Terence Morris (Hapoel Jerusalem)

Israeli MVP 

  Raviv Limonad (Ironi Nahariya)

Rising star 

  Guni Israeli (Hapoel Gilboa/Afula)

Individual statistical awards 

 Top scorer –  Ricardo Marsh (Elitzur Ashkelon) (20.9 Per game)
 Top Rebounder –  Kenny Adelka (Hapoel Galil Elyon) (9.3)
 Top Assists –  Guni Israeli (Hapoel Gilboa/Afula) (6.5)
 Top Steals –  Marcus Hatten (Elitzur Ashkelon) (2.7)

Israeli
League